Italian dialects may refer to:

Regional Italian, any regional variety of the Italian language
Languages of Italy, any language spoken in Italy, regardless of origin
 , languages that are related to Italian but do not stem from it